NCTL may refer to:
National Center on Time & Learning, American educational organisation
National College for Teaching and Leadership, United Kingdom
 National Congress of Thai Labour, Thailand
Nembe Creek Trunk Line, a pipeline in Nigeria